Damacio Jiménez was Tejano soldier who served under Juan Seguín during the Battle of the Alamo, but was not recognized as such until 150 years afterwards. Records placing him among those who perished in the battle were found in 1986 among court files by Laredo, Texas attorney Raul Casso IV. In support of an 1861 military land grant claim by the heirs of Jiménez, Seguin provided sworn testimony verifying the soldier's place in his company, as did Cornelio Delgado who stated he had seen Jiménez's corpse after the battle. The cash-poor Republic of Texas adopted a system of military land grants in lieu of service pay. Issuance of the grants were dependent upon the military muster lists and either the veterans or their heirs filing a claim, a process that required an upfront fee to complete. For service at the Battle of the Alamo and the Goliad massacre, the heirs were eligible to file for the land grants. Researchers on the defenders of the Alamo sometimes relied on the military land grants, but did not always check through the muster lists. Although the claim was filed in 1861, it was never registered due to a lack of filing fee. Casso referred to Jiménez as "the 189th Alamo defender". He was officially added to the list of Alamo defenders in 1987.

Tejanos who served under Juan Seguín

Bibliography

References

Alamo defenders
Tejano people